Eucereon melanoperas is a moth of the subfamily Arctiinae. It was described by George Hampson in 1898. It is found in Tefé, Brazil.

References

 

melanoperas
Moths described in 1898